Dąbrowa  (German Dambrau) is a village in Opole County, Opole Voivodeship, in south-western Poland. It is the seat of the gmina (administrative district) called Gmina Dąbrowa.

The village has a population of 1,100.

References

Villages in Opole County